This article lists awards and honours that players of the Newcastle Knights club have received.

RLIF Awards

Rugby League Golden Boot
1999
Andrew Johns
2001
Andrew Johns

Dally M Awards

Player Of The Year (Dally M Medal)
1998
Andrew Johns
1999
Andrew Johns
2002
Andrew Johns
2004
Danny Buderus

Winger Of The Year
1990
Ashley Gordon
1995
Jamie Ainscough
2006
Brian Carney
2010
Akuila Uate
2011
Akuila Uate

Halfback Of The Year
1995
Andrew Johns
1998
Andrew Johns
1999
Andrew Johns
2002
Andrew Johns

Prop Of The Year
1996
Paul Harragon

Hooker Of The Year
2002
Danny Buderus
2004
Danny Buderus
2005
Danny Buderus

Rookie Of The Year
1992
Matthew Rodwell

Representative Player Of The Year
2002
Danny Buderus
2005
Andrew Johns

Provan-Summons Medal
1998
Andrew Johns
1999
Andrew Johns
2000
Andrew Johns
2001
Andrew Johns
2002
Andrew Johns

Peter Frilingos Memorial Award
2005
Andrew Johns

Bronze Dally M Player Of The Year
1995
Andrew Johns

General Awards

Clive Churchill Medal
1997
Robbie O'Davis
2001
Andrew Johns

Rothmans Medal
1989
Mark Sargent

State Of Origin Awards

Man Of The Match
1994
Paul Harragon (Game 2)
1996
Andrew Johns (Game 2)
2000
Adam MacDougall (Game 1)
2002
Andrew Johns (Game 1)
2003
Andrew Johns (Game 2)
2005
Andrew Johns (Game 2)

Brad Fittler Medal
2008
Danny Buderus
2010
Kurt Gidley

Ron McAuliffe Medal
1997
Robbie O'Davis

Honours

Immortal
Andrew Johns (2012)

The ARL's 100 Greatest Players
No. 47
Andrew Johns
No. 96
Steve Walters

References

Newcastle Knights